Hamilton is a town in the eastern central portion of Essex County in eastern Massachusetts, United States.  At the 2020 census, it had a population of 7,561. Currently the town has no manufacturing industry and no industrially-zoned land.

Though Hamilton is a landlocked town in the North Shore region of Massachusetts, its proximity to it provides easy access to the Atlantic seashore with its reservations, beaches and boating. The town includes many historic houses, pastoral landscapes, and old stone walls that accompany winding tree-lined roads. It also has a rich equestrian heritage, which remains strong due to the influence of the many horse farms and of Myopia Hunt Club, which holds frequent equestrian events, including polo most Sunday afternoons. (Myopia also hosts a Thanksgiving Day fox hunt each year that the public may attend.)  Thus, people visiting Hamilton may well share the secondary roads with horse and pony riders. Patton Park, one of the parks in downtown Hamilton, was named after General George S. Patton. The park is a center of activity for the town.

Hamilton is closely tied to neighboring Wenham, sharing a school system, library, recreation department, commuter rail station and newspaper.  In 2010, the community of Hamilton-Wenham was listed among the "Best Places to Live" by Boston Magazine.

Hamilton includes South Hamilton, which is that part of Hamilton that the Postal Service has assigned the zip code 01982. "Hamilton" and "South Hamilton" are indistinguishable from each other except for the difference in zip codes.

History

In June 1638, John Winthrop the Younger, son of the founder of the Massachusetts Bay Colony, bought most of present-day Essex County from Masconomet, chief of the Agawam Indians, for the sum of twenty English pounds.  A memorial stone on Sagamore Hill in southeastern Hamilton marks where Masconomet was buried with his gun and tomahawk around 1658.
 
Hamilton was first settled in 1638 and was originally a section of Ipswich known as "The Hamlet". The first recorded land grant in the Hamlet was Matthew Whipple's farm, dated 1638. Three years later the new stagecoach road from Boston to Newburyport (Bay Road) was laid out through the Whipple land.  Other early settlers of the Hamlet, including the Appletons, Winthrops, Lamsons, and Dodges, were attracted by countryside similar to the English farms and estates they had left behind.

The town was incorporated on June 21, 1793, and named for Alexander Hamilton, whose portrait became the town seal in 1903. With the arrival of the Boston and Maine Railroad in 1839, the population center moved gradually southward toward the depot.

The farm village proved to be an attractive location for Boston groups seeking land for recreation and renewal.  A Methodist ministers' association first held a camp meeting at Asbury Grove in 1859.  In the 1880s, the Myopia Hunt Club, which had been named in jest for its nearsighted founders, moved from Winchester, Massachusetts, to the Gibney Farm in Hamilton.  Beginning as a lawn tennis and baseball club, it turned to polo, the hunt, and golf as members built large summer estates in the area.  Myopia donated the site for the General George S. Patton Memorial Park to the town of Hamilton.  The park continues to be a recreation center for the town.

In 1921, the Mandell family built the Community House in memory of the eight men in Hamilton and Wenham who died in military service during World War I, including their son, Sam.  They commissioned Guy Lowell, a respected architect of Boston and New York, to design the building, and gave the Community House in trust for the use of the residents of both towns.  Although in its early days the Community House offered activities such as bowling and a men's smoking room, it now features a wide range of classes and activities for all ages.

Geography
The highest point in town is found on Blueberry Hill in Bradley Palmer State Park, with an elevation of at least , according to the most recent (2011-2012) USGS 7.5-minute topographical map. Several areas of town are protected, including Myopia Hunt Club and parts of Bradley Palmer State Park, Appleton Farm Grass Rides, and the Ipswich River Wildlife Sanctuary.

Hamilton is bordered by Ipswich to the north, Essex to the east, Manchester-by-the-Sea to the southeast, Wenham to the south, and Topsfield to the west.

Transportation
 MBTA Commuter Rail provides service from Boston's North Station with the Hamilton/Wenham station on its Newburyport branch of the Newburyport/Rockport Line. The MBTA Commuter Rail is walking distance from the town hall, homes and the many small shops in town. 
 There are no freeways within town; Route 128 provides the nearest access in Beverly, MA. Route 1A passes through the center of town, and Route 22 passes through the eastern corner of town between Wenham and its eastern terminus in Essex.
 The nearest airport is Beverly Municipal Airport, and the nearest national and international air service can be found at Boston's Logan International Airport.

Demographics

As of the census of 2000, there were 8,315 people, 2,668 households, and 2,142 families residing in the town. (Update: The population was 8251 in 2009, down less than 100 from the 8,315 of the 2000 census. Based on the total area, both land and water, the density is therefore 553.8 persons per square mile.) The racial makeup of the town was 94.19% White, 0.47% African American, 0.17% Native American, 4.26% Asian, 0.05% Pacific Islander, 0.34% from other races, and 0.53% from two or more races. Hispanic or Latino of any race were 0.99% of the population.

There were 2,668 households, out of which 66.6% had children under the age of 18 living with them, 71.1% were married couples living together, 7.3% had a female householder with no husband present, and 19.7% were non-families. 15.7% of all households were made up of individuals, and 7.0% had someone living alone who was 65 years of age or older.  The average household size was 2.87 and the average family size was 3.22.

In the town, the population was spread out, with 27.4% under the age of 18, 5.9% from 18 to 24, 33.3% from 25 to 44, 23.0% from 45 to 64, and 10.4% who were 65 years of age or older.  The median age was 36 years. For every 100 females, there were 96.8 males.  For every 100 females age 18 and over, there were 95.1 males.

The median income for a household in the town was $72,000, and the median income for a family was $79,886. Males had a median income of $51,776 versus $37,013 for females. The per capita income for the town was $33,222.  About 3.4% of families and 5.3% of the population were below the poverty line, including 5.1% of those under age 18 and 3.2% of those age 65 or over.

Education
Hamilton is esteemed for the regional school district it shares with neighboring Wenham, and Hamilton is where the majority of the schools in the Hamilton-Wenham Regional School District are located. The town serves two elementary schools; the Winthrop, and Cutler schools. The town only has one middle school; the Miles River Middle School. High School students attend Hamilton-Wenham Regional High School.

At Hamilton-Wenham Regional High School, students' average SAT scores are above the state average (According to numbers released by the state Dept of Education, Hamilton-Wenham Regional High School ranked 27th in the state based on combined total SAT scores for the 2006/2007 school year), and the school regularly sends top students to Ivy League schools. Boston Magazine's 2010 issue showcasing a list of the best public high schools ranked Hamilton-Wenham Regional High School 12th, placing Hamilton-Wenham's public high school in the top 10 percent of the state overall.  Hamilton-Wenham also had one of the highest graduation rates, at 96.8 percent.  By 2011, Hamilton-Wenham Regional High School had moved up to number nine in Boston Magazine's "Best Schools" list.  
More recently, Hamilton-Wenham Regional High School ranked 107th (out of 14,000) on Newsweek's 2014 list of "America's Top High Schools" and Hamilton-Wenham Regional High School was ranked the 13th-best public high school in Massachusetts in the 2016 U.S. News & World Report rankings (the same report ranked Hamilton-Wenham 344th nationally.)

According to a September 29, 2010, article in the Hamilton-Wenham Chronicle: "Of the 885 schools in Massachusetts, the Bessie Buker Elementary School ranked second in science on this year's MCAS. The fifth-grade class at the school had 93 percent of its students score advanced and proficient. In addition, all ninth-grade students passed the biology test, with 92 percent scoring advanced and proficient, ranking 20th state-wide. Cutler School scored 21st state-wide with 90 percent of third-graders scoring advanced and proficient in English language arts."

The Pingree School, a private secondary school, is located on the historic Pingree Family Estate in Hamilton.

Hamilton is also home to Gordon-Conwell Theological Seminary, an interdenominational evangelical theological seminary.

Notable people
 Bo Burnham, comedian, musician, filmmaker, and Grammy Award winning artist
 Michael Carter-Williams, basketball player
 David M. Kelly, lawyer and politician
 Masconomet, Native American chief
 David Morse, actor
 Kevin O'Connor, television host
 George S. Patton, U.S. Army general
George S. Patton IV, U.S. Army general and son of the above
 John Ryan Pike, former drummer for Ra Ra Riot
 Justin Rennicks, soccer player
 John Shea, archaeologist
 Marcus Zegarowski, former Creighton University basketball player and current NBA player
 George von Lengerke Meyer, U.S. Ambassador to Italy and Russia, Secretary of the Navy, and Postmaster General

Historic places

 Asbury Grove
 Austin Brown House
 Brown House (Hamilton, Massachusetts)
 Emeline Patch House
 Hamilton Historic District
 Myopia Hunt Club, site of the U.S. Open in 1898, 1901, 1905, and 1908
 Woodberry-Quarrels House

Further reading
Hamilton, Massachusetts American Revolution Bicentennial Commission, "Hamilton, Massachusetts : Chronicle of a Country Town" (1976)

Notes

References

Bibliography

External links

 Town of Hamilton official website
 
 
 1884 Map of Hamilton. Plate 103 of the Atlas of Essex County Massachusetts, published 1884.
 Old USGS maps of Hamilton
 Historical Resources for Hamilton, at Rootsweb